Hesperobaris is a genus of flower weevils in the beetle family Curculionidae, with currently one described species in North America.

Species
 Hesperobaris suavis Casey, 1892

References

Further reading

 

Baridinae
Articles created by Qbugbot